The 1990 Hawal Massacre was named after the Hawal area of Srinagar, Kashmir, where, on 21 May 1990, the Indian paramilitary troops of the Central Reserve Police Force opened fire on the peaceful funeral procession which was carrying the body of Mirwaiz Moulana Muhammad Farooq who was assassinated by unidentified gunmen at his Nageen Residence. The funeral procession was taking the body from SKIMS, Soura to Mirwaiz Manzil, Rajouri Kadal.

The Massacre 
Mirwaiz Moulana Muhammad Farooq who was the then Mirwaiz of Kashmir had been brutally killed by gunmen at his residence and his followers took his body in a funeral procession towards Mirwaiz Manzil when the paramilitary personnel stationed in a camp at Islamia College started indiscriminately firing using their machine guns trained at the peaceful procession. 

Victims of the attack state how the massacre was completely unprovoked and they were all unarmed yet the forces fired thousands of bullets. Over 60 were killed and 200 were injured in the massacre and this remains to be one of the deadliest massacres in Kashmir.

Aftermath 
The then Governor had announced a ‘time-bound’ inquiry into the massacre within a period of two months. However, in reply to an RTI application in 2013, the then divisional commissioner Kashmir had stated that a criminal case vide FIR 35/1990 was registered into the incident at Nowhatta police station.  

“However, there is no information with the department as to whether there was any inquiry, judicial or magisterial, ordered by the government,” he had stated. 

On a petition by a human rights activist, the State Human Rights Commission (SHRC) in 2014 ordered time bound inquiry into the massacre and sought a report from the government within two months. 

“Despite various communications addressed to the DGP, divisional commissioner Kashmir and also from secretary of the commission, authorities are unmoved. In view of the insensitive approach of the authorities, the commission is left with no option but to entrust the inquiry to the investigating wing of this commission,” the SHRC had stated. 

In December 2017, the investigation wing of the SHRC found that the CRPF had identified 15 of its officers and personnel for “indiscriminate firing” that killed “35 civilians at Hawal in 1990. “The SHRC investigation, however, could not ascertain if any action was taken against these CRPF officers and personnel.

See also 

 Gawkadal massacre
 Zakoora and Tengpora massacre
 Sopore massacre
 Handwara massacre
 Bijbehara massacre
 Human rights abuses in Jammu and Kashmir

References 

Conflicts in 1990
1990s in Jammu and Kashmir
May 1990 events in Asia
May 1990 crimes
Political repression in India
Massacres in 1990
Military scandals
Srinagar
1990 in India
Massacres in Jammu and Kashmir
Massacres committed by India